The Berlin Infantry Brigade was a British Army brigade-sized garrison based in West Berlin during the Cold War. After the end of World War II, under the conditions of the Yalta and Potsdam agreements, the Allied forces occupied West Berlin. This occupation lasted throughout the Cold War. The French Army also had units in Berlin, called the French Forces in Berlin and the US Army's unit in Berlin was the Berlin Brigade.

History

The Berlin Infantry Brigade was formed in October 1953 out of the force called "Area Troops Berlin" and consisted of some 3,100 men in three infantry battalions, an armoured squadron, and a number of support units. Its shoulder sleeve insignia was a red circle over a black background with the word Berlin in red on a black background running around the top. It was not initially part of the British Army of the Rhine despite being based in Germany. However, by the mid-1980s, the brigade is recorded to have become part of the BAOR, being its second major component after I (BR) Corps.

In 1946 the military postal address for Berlin based British troops was 'BAOR 2' but when the BFPO indication number was introduced in 1951 to was changed to 'BFPO 45' and remained its address until the British troops were withdrawn from Berlin in 1994.

The three infantry battalions and armoured squadron assigned to Berlin were rotated regularly; the single armoured squadron was detached from an armoured regiment assigned to I (BR) Corps. The infantry battalions were rotated every two years. All other units were permanently based in Berlin.

Structure
At the time when the Berlin Wall fell (9 November 1989), the operational structure of the British forces in Berlin was as follows:
 HQ Berlin
Berlin Infantry Brigade
 Berlin Infantry Brigade HQ & (29th) Signal Regiment, Royal Signals
 1st Btn, King's Regiment, Wavell Barracks, (replaced by 1st Btn, Irish Guards December 1989)
 1st Btn, The Light Infantry, Brooke Barracks
 1st Btn, Royal Welch Fusiliers, Montgomery Barracks
 C Squadron, 14th/20th King's Hussars, Smuts Barracks, (14x Chieftain)
 6 Troop, 46 (Talavera) Air Defence Battery, 2 Field Regiment, Royal Artillery, (12x Javelin)
 38 (Berlin) Field Squadron, Royal Engineers Smuts Barracks
 Detachment, 164 Railway Operations Company, Royal Engineers
 Berlin Postal & Courier Troop, Royal Engineers
 2nd Regiment, Royal Military Police
 246 (Berlin) Provost Company, Royal Military Police, in Helmstedt, mans Checkpoint Alpha
 247 (Berlin) Provost Company, Royal Military Police, mans Checkpoint Bravo and Checkpoint Charlie
 248 German Security Unit, support unit with German personnel
 3 Squadron, 13 Signal Regiment (Radio), Royal Signals, Signals Intelligence at RAF Gatow & Olympic Stadium
 3 Intelligence and Security Company, Intelligence Corps
 7 Flight AAC, RAF Gatow, (4x Gazelle AH.1)
 Royal Air Force Gatow Station Flight, (2x Chipmunk T10)
 No. 26 Signals Unit, Royal Air Force, (Signals intelligence at RAF Gatow and Teufelsberg
 British Military Hospital Berlin
 2 Field Sanitation Section
 50 British Red Cross Convalescent Home
 194 Field Dental Centre
 62 Transport & Movements Squadron, Royal Corps of Transport
 Movement Control Office (MCO) Gatow
 14 (Berlin) Field Workshop, Royal Electrical and Mechanical Engineers, Alexander Barracks
 Berlin Ordnance Company, Royal Army Ordnance Corps
 Ordnance & Ammunition Depot, Royal Army Ordnance Corps
 93 Section Special Investigation Branch, Royal Military Police
 31 Quartering and Barracks Office, Royal Army Ordnance Corps
 504th Commander Royal Army Service Corps (CRASC) (Overseas Deployment Training)
 Detachment, 2 Independent Petrol Platoon, Royal Army Ordnance Corps
 121 Barracks Stores, Royal Army Ordnance Corps
 122 Barracks Stores, Royal Army Ordnance Corps
 131 Detail Issue Depot, Royal Army Ordnance Corps
 3 Station Maintenance Section, Royal Army Ordnance Corps
 District Depot Railways Berlin - Lines of Communication
 Railway Transport Officer Station Spandau
 Railway Transport Officer Station Grunewald
 Railway Transport Officer Station Charlottenburg
 BRIXMIS, British Commanders'-in-Chief Mission to Soviet Forces in Germany administered by Berlin Bde HQ

Under the treaties that enabled the German reunification, all non-German military forces were required to leave Berlin. Therefore the brigade was reduced to two battalions in 1992, then further reduced in 1993 to a single battalion. Finally Berlin Infantry Brigade was officially disbanded in September 1994 and its troops moved to the United Kingdom or British Forces Germany garrisons.

See also
 British Forces Germany
 Berlin Brigade
 French Forces in Berlin

References

Further reading

External links and references

 248 German Security Unit Veterans Association
 Berlin Brigade Memories
 History of the Berlin Brigade
 History of the French, American and British Berlin Brigades
 Berlin 1969 – the Allies in Berlin at midpoint of the Cold War
 British Army of the Rhine Locations
 Berlin-Brigade Installations

 BerlinBrigade.com Dedicated to all that served in West Berlin from 1945 to 1994

British Army deployments
Cold War military history of Germany
Military units and formations established in 1953
Allied occupation of Germany
West Berlin